Brezovci is a village in the Municipality of Puconci in the Prekmurje region of Slovenia.

There is a small chapel in the centre of the village with a three-story belfry.

Notable people
Notable people that were born or lived in Brezovci include:
Ferenc Talányi (a.k.a. Ferenc Temlin), founder of the Prekmurje Slovene almanac Dober pajdás (The Good Friend).

References

External links 
Brezovci on Geopedia

Populated places in the Municipality of Puconci